An autotroph is an organism that produces complex organic compounds (such as carbohydrates, fats, and proteins) using carbon from simple substances such as carbon dioxide, generally using energy from light (photosynthesis) or inorganic chemical reactions (chemosynthesis). They convert an abiotic source of energy (e.g. light) into energy stored in organic compounds, which can be used by other organisms (e.g. heterotrophs).  Autotrophs do not need a living source of carbon or energy and are the producers in a food chain, such as plants on land or algae in water (in contrast to heterotrophs as consumers of autotrophs or other heterotrophs).  Autotrophs can reduce carbon dioxide to make organic compounds for biosynthesis and as stored chemical fuel.  Most autotrophs use water as the reducing agent, but some can use other hydrogen compounds such as hydrogen sulfide.

The primary producers can convert the energy in the light (phototroph and photoautotroph) or the energy in inorganic chemical compounds (chemotrophs or chemolithotrophs) to build organic molecules, which is usually accumulated in the form of biomass and will be used as carbon and energy source by other organisms (e.g. heterotrophs and mixotrophs). The photoautotrophs are the main primary producers, converting the energy of the light into chemical energy through photosynthesis, ultimately building organic molecules from carbon dioxide, an inorganic carbon source. Examples of chemolithotrophs are some archaea and bacteria (unicellular organisms) that produce biomass from the oxidation of inorganic chemical compounds, these organisms are called chemoautotrophs, and are frequently found in hydrothermal vents in the deep ocean. Primary producers are at the lowest trophic level, and are the reasons why Earth sustains life to this day.

Most chemoautotrophs are lithotrophs, using inorganic electron donors such as hydrogen sulfide, hydrogen gas, elemental sulfur, ammonium and ferrous oxide as reducing agents and hydrogen sources for biosynthesis and chemical energy release. Autotrophs use a portion of the ATP produced during photosynthesis or the oxidation of chemical compounds to reduce NADP+ to NADPH to form organic compounds.

History
The term autotroph was coined by the German botanist Albert Bernhard Frank in 1892. It stems from the ancient Greek word , meaning "nourishment" or "food". The first autotrophic organism developed about 2 billion years ago. Photoautotrophs evolved from heterotrophic bacteria by developing photosynthesis. The earliest photosynthetic bacteria used hydrogen sulphide. Due to the scarcity of hydrogen sulphide, some photosynthetic bacteria evolved to use water in photosynthesis, leading to cyanobacteria.

Variants
Some organisms rely on organic compounds as a source of carbon, but are able to use light or inorganic compounds as a source of energy. Such organisms are mixotrophs. An organism that obtains carbon from organic compounds but obtains energy from light is called a photoheterotroph, while an organism that obtains carbon from organic compounds and energy from the oxidation of inorganic compounds is termed a chemolithoheterotroph.

Evidence suggests that some fungi may also obtain energy from ionizing radiation: Such radiotrophic fungi were found growing inside a reactor of the Chernobyl nuclear power plant.

Examples 
There are many different types of primary producers out in the Earth's ecosystem at different states. Fungi and other organisms that gain their biomass from oxidizing organic materials are called decomposers and are not primary producers. However, lichens located in tundra climates are an exceptional example of a primary producer that, by mutualistic symbiosis, combines photosynthesis by algae (or additionally nitrogen fixation by cyanobacteria) with the protection of a decomposer fungus. Also, plant-like primary producers (trees, algae) use the sun as a form of energy and put it into the air for other organisms. There are of course H2O primary producers, including a form of bacteria, and phytoplankton. As there are many examples of primary producers, two dominant types are coral and one of the many types of brown algae, kelp.

Photosynthesis 
Gross primary production occurs by photosynthesis. This is also the main way that primary producers take energy and produce/release it somewhere else. Plants, coral, bacteria, and algae do this. During photosynthesis, primary producers take energy from the sun and convert it into energy, sugar, and oxygen. Primary producers also need the energy to convert this same energy elsewhere, so they get it from nutrients. One type of nutrient is nitrogen.

Ecology

Without primary producers, organisms that are capable of producing energy on their own, the biological systems of Earth would be unable to sustain themselves. Plants, along with other primary producers, produce the energy that other living beings consume, and the oxygen that they breathe. It is thought that the first organisms on Earth were primary producers located on the ocean floor.

Autotrophs are fundamental to the food chains of all ecosystems in the world. They take energy from the environment in the form of sunlight or inorganic chemicals and use it to create fuel molecules such as carbohydrates. This mechanism is called primary production. Other organisms, called heterotrophs, take in autotrophs as food to carry out functions necessary for their life. Thus, heterotrophs – all animals, almost all fungi, as well as most bacteria and protozoa – depend on autotrophs, or primary producers, for the raw materials and fuel they need. Heterotrophs obtain energy by breaking down carbohydrates or oxidizing organic molecules (carbohydrates, fats, and proteins) obtained in food. Carnivorous organisms rely on autotrophs indirectly, as the nutrients obtained from their heterotrophic prey come from autotrophs they have consumed.

Most ecosystems are supported by the autotrophic primary production of plants and cyanobacteria that capture photons initially released by the sun. Plants can only use a fraction (approximately 1%) of this energy for photosynthesis. The process of photosynthesis splits a water molecule (H2O), releasing oxygen (O2) into the atmosphere, and reducing carbon dioxide (CO2) to release the hydrogen atoms that fuel the metabolic process of primary production. Plants convert and store the energy of the photon into the chemical bonds of simple sugars during photosynthesis. These plant sugars are polymerized for storage as long-chain carbohydrates, including other sugars, starch, and cellulose; glucose is also used to make fats and proteins. When autotrophs are eaten by heterotrophs, i.e., consumers such as animals, the carbohydrates, fats, and proteins contained in them become energy sources for the heterotrophs. Proteins can be made using nitrates, sulfates, and phosphates in the soil.

Primary production in tropical streams and rivers
Aquatic algae are a significant contributor to food webs in tropical rivers and streams. This is displayed by net primary production, a fundamental ecological process that reflects the amount of carbon that is synthesized within an ecosystem. This carbon ultimately becomes available to consumers. Net primary production displays that the rates of in-stream primary production in tropical regions are at least an order of magnitude greater than in similar temperate systems.

Origin of autotrophs 

Researchers believe that the first cellular lifeforms were not heterotrophs as they would rely upon autotrophs since organic substrates that were delivered from space was either too heterogeneous to support microbial growth or too reduced to be fermented. Instead, they consider that the first cells were autotrophs. These autotrophs might have been thermophilic and anaerobic chemolithoautotrophs that lived at deep sea alkaline hydrothermal vents. Catalytic Fe(Ni)S minerals at these environments are shown to catalyze biomolecules like RNA. This view is supported by phylogenetic evidence as the physiology and habitat of the last universal common ancestor (LUCA) was inferred to have also been a thermophilic anaerobe with a Wood-Ljungdahl pathway, its biochemistry was replete with FeS clusters and radical reaction mechanisms, and was dependent upon Fe, H2, and CO2. The high concentration of K+ present within the cytosol of most life forms suggest that early cellular life had Na+/H+ antiporters or possibly symporters. Autotrophs possibly evolved into heterotrophs when they were at low H2 partial pressures and photosynthesis emerged in the presence of long-wavelength geothermal light at hydrothermal vents.

See also 
 Electrolithoautotroph
 Electrotroph
 Heterotrophic nutrition
 Organotroph
 Primary nutritional groups

References

External links
 
 
 

Trophic ecology
Microbial growth and nutrition
Biology terminology
Plant nutrition